The Kentucky State Thorobreds and Thorobrettes are the intercollegiate athletic teams that represent Kentucky State University, located in Frankfort, Kentucky, in intercollegiate sports at the Division II level of the National Collegiate Athletic Association (NCAA). The Thorobreds and Thorobrettes are members of the Southern Intercollegiate Athletic Conference (SIAC), which they have competed since the 1997–98 academic year. Kentucky State previously competed in the Great Lakes Valley Conference (GLVC) from 1989–90 to 1993–94.

Varsity teams

Facilities
The William Exum Center, the university's athletic and recreational complex, was named after William Exum, the first African-American varsity football player at the University of Wisconsin. Exum was hired as head of KSU's Physical Education department in 1949, and later made head of the Athletics department. He then became manager of the United States Track and Field teams at the 1972 and 1976 Olympics. Exum retired from KSU in 1980.

List of teams

Men's sports (8)
 Baseball
 Basketball
 Cross Country
 Football
 Golf
 Track & field (indoor and outdoor)
 Volleyball

Women's sports (6)
 Basketball
 Cross country
 Softball
 Track & field (indoor and outdoor)
 Volleyball

Notes

Men's basketball
From 1970 to 1972, the Thorobreds won three straight NAIA national titles (1970, 1971, 1972). As of 2017, they are still only the second team to do so, joining Tennessee State (1957, 1958, 1959).

National championships

Team

Conferences

Classifications
NCAA
 1951–1972: NCAA College Division
 1973–present: NCAA Division II

NAIA
 1958–1969: NAIA
 1970–1984: NAIA Division I

Conference affiliations
 1907–08 to 1944–45: Independent
 1945–46 to 1961–62: Midwest Athletic Association
 1962–63 to 1963–64: Midwest Conference
 1964–65 to 1966–67: Midwestern Conference
 1967–68 to 1972–73: NAIA Independent
 1973–74 to 1988–89: Division II Independent
 1989–90 to 1993–94: Great Lakes Valley Conference
 1994–95 to 1996–97: Division II Independent
 1997–98 to present: Southern Intercollegiate Athletic Conference

References

External links